Michael Clark (born October 26, 1995) is a former American football wide receiver. He played college football at Marshall, and was signed by the Green Bay Packers as an undrafted free agent in 2017.

College career
Clark originally played basketball at St. Francis (PA) during the 2014–15 season. He then transferred and played college football at Marshall.

College statistics

Professional career

After going undrafted in the 2017 NFL Draft, Clark signed with the Green Bay Packers as an undrafted free agent on May 5, 2017. He was waived by the Packers on September 2, 2017 and was signed to the practice squad the next day. He was promoted to the active roster on December 1, 2017.

Clark was re-signed by the Packers on March 14, 2018.

On July 25, 2018, the Packers placed Clark on the reserve/did not report list after failing to report to training camp. It was then revealed that Clark had announced his retirement from the NFL.

NFL career statistics

References

External links
Green Bay Packers bio
St. Francis Red Flash bio
Marshall Thundering Herd bio

1995 births
Living people
American football wide receivers
American men's basketball players
Green Bay Packers players
Marshall Thundering Herd football players
Players of American football from Massachusetts
Saint Francis Red Flash men's basketball players
Sportspeople from Salem, Massachusetts